Deadtime Stories is an anthology horror-fantasy television series written by Annette Cascone and based on the book series of the same title (created by Annette and Gina Cascone) that aired from November 2, 2012 to November 14, 2013.

Premise
The series stars Jennifer Stone as "The Babysitter" who reads the Deadtime Stories to the children while babysitting. Piper Reese in the recurring-turned-lead role Nancy Patanski as the neighborhood tough girl who ended up facing off with Giggles the Killer Clown while babysitting in Who's Giggling Now.

Episodes

Broadcast
Deadtime Stories aired on Nickelodeon in the United States from October 3 to November 14, 2013. The show aired on TVOntario's Programming block called TVOKids in Canada in 2012, and on CITV in the UK in 2013. It later aired on Disney XD in Canada.

References

External links
 

2010s Nickelodeon original programming
2010s American horror television series
2012 American television series debuts
2013 American television series endings
2010s American anthology television series
American fantasy television series
Television series by DHX Media
Television series by Cookie Jar Entertainment